Soozie Tyrell (born May 4, 1957), formerly known as Soozie Kirschner, is an American violinist, guitarist, and vocalist, most known for her work with Bruce Springsteen in the E Street Band and formerly The Sessions Band.

Biography
Tyrell was born in Pisa, Italy, and as the daughter of a military serviceman travelled extensively. Eventually her family settled in Florida and she briefly took music theory classes at the University of South Florida.  She then relocated to New York City where she became a street musician for many years. Together with Patti Scialfa and Lisa Lowell, she formed a street group known as Trickster.

Tyrell began appearing on records with Southside Johnny & The Asbury Jukes' Love is a Sacrifice in 1980.  She then led her own country and western band, Soozie & High in the Saddle. Beginning in mid-1980s Tyrell worked with David Johansen and his Buster Poindexter alter-ego for fifteen years, appearing on six albums and a number of tours as well as collaborating on the musical Poet's Café.  Tyrell, Scialfa and Lowell performed on David Johansen's stage named eponymous first Buster Poindexter album released in 1987 on RCA Records featuring the popular dance hall single, "Hot-Hot-Hot"; their friendship and mutual recording industry projects continue to the present.

Tyrell first appeared with Bruce Springsteen in 1992 on his Lucky Town album, as a backing vocalist. She subsequently performed on every Springsteen album of new studio material since that time, primarily as a violinist and backing singer, including the albums The Ghost of Tom Joad and Devils & Dust, which were not E Street Band albums, making her the musician who has performed on more Springsteen albums in the last twenty years than most of the other members of the E Street Band, with the exception of Patti Scialfa and Springsteen himself.

In 2002 her violin became a key part of the sound on Springsteen's album The Rising, and Tyrell joined the E Street Band for the subsequent 2002–2003 Rising Tour. She also played a prominent role in his non-E Street, big band folk-oriented 2006 album We Shall Overcome: The Seeger Sessions and the subsequent Sessions Band Tour.  She contributed to Springsteen's albums Magic (2007), Working on a Dream (2009), Wrecking Ball (2012), High Hopes (2014), Western Stars (2019) and Only the Strong Survive (2022). She was a key facet of Springsteen and the E Street Band's ensuing Magic, Working on a Dream, and Wrecking Ball Tours.  On them she was onstage for every number, playing acoustic guitar in addition to violin, and singing some featured duet parts during the frequent absences of bandmate and Springsteen wife Patti Scialfa. On both the Magic and Working On a Dream Tour, her spot on stage rotated between a riser beside Bittan and in Scialfa's spot when she wasn't present. Since the Wrecking Ball Tour, she has stood in Clarence Clemons’ former spot.

In 2003, Tyrell's debut album White Lines was released on Treasure Records.

In 2014 Tyrell was featured on the compilation Songs from a Stolen Spring.  On the album she performed "Danger Zone" - a Percy Mayfield song made famous by Ray Charles.

Discography with Bruce Springsteen
Lucky Town (1992)
The Ghost of Tom Joad (1995)
Blood Brothers (1996)
The Rising (2002)
The Essential Bruce Springsteen (2003)
Devils & Dust (2005)
We Shall Overcome: The Seeger Sessions (2006)
Bruce Springsteen with The Sessions Band: Live in Dublin (2007)
Magic (2007)
Magic Tour Highlights (2008)
Greatest Hits (2009)
Working on a Dream (2009)
The Promise (2010)
Wrecking Ball (2012)
High Hopes (2014)
American Beauty (2014)
Western Stars (2019)
Only the Strong Survive (2022)

Tours with Bruce Springsteen
Guest musician during the 1992-1993 "Other Band" Tour, 1995-1997 Ghost of Tom Joad Tour, and 1999-2000 Reunion Tour
The Rising Tour with the E Street Band, 2002-2003
Vote for Change Tour with the E Street Band, 2004
Seeger Sessions Tour with the Sessions Band, 2006
Magic Tour with the E Street Band, 2007-2008
Working On A Dream Tour with the E Street Band, 2009
Wrecking Ball Tour with the E Street Band, 2012-2013
High Hopes Tour with the E Street Band, 2014
The River Tour 2016 with the E Street Band, 2016–2017

References

 "From Bleecker Street to E Street: An Interview with Soozie Tyrell", Anthony D'Amato, Upstage Magazine, October 2005.

1957 births
Living people
American violinists
E Street Band members
Southside Johnny & The Asbury Jukes members
American street performers
People from Pisa
Jersey Shore musicians
21st-century violinists
The Sessions Band members